The following is a list of Eupterotidae of Nepal. Fourteen different species are listed.

This list is primarily based on Colin Smith's 2010 "Lepidoptera of Nepal", which is based on Toshiro Haruta's "Moths of Nepal (Vol. 1-6)" with some recent additions and a modernized classification. 

Apha floralis
Apona caschmirensis
Eupterote gardneri syn. Eupterote bifasciata 
Eupterote fabia
Eupterote geminata
Eupterote glaucescens
Eupterote lineosa
Eupterote undata
Ganisa plana
Ganisa similis
Nisaga simplex
Palirisa cervina
Palirisa lineosa
Pseudojana incandescens

See also
List of butterflies of Nepal
Odonata of Nepal
Cerambycidae of Nepal
Wildlife of Nepal

References

 01
Eupterotidae
Insects of Nepal